Mifflin County High School is a mid sized, rural public high school. It is the sole high school operated by the Mifflin County School District. The school was established in 2011, by the merging of the district's two former high schools (Indian Valley High School and Lewistown Area). This move was due to budget cuts and aging facilities in the other schools. Construction of Mifflin County High School cost $64 million in 2011. Local public debt was used to finance the building. The 251,088 square foot building was built by Hayes Large Architects, LLP. In the 2018–19 school year, the school's enrollment was reported as 1,186.

Students may choose to attend Mifflin-Juniata Career and Technology Center for training in the building trades, allied health services and culinary arts. Students may also choose a full or partial online study program called the ALPHA Program. Pupils in ALPHA use Blended learning to earn 21.5 credits to graduate. Students are not permitted to use the program to graduate early or earn credits ahead.

The Tuscarora Intermediate Unit IU11 provides the school with a wide variety of services like specialized education for disabled students and hearing, speech and visual disability services and professional development for staff and faculty

Vocational-Education
Students of Mifflin County may pursue a vocational trade at the nearby Academy of Science and Technology in Lewistown for part of their school day while attending MCHS for the other half.

Extracurriculars
Mifflin County School District offers a variety of clubs, activities and sports.

Athletics
MCHS participates in PIAA District VI. However, due to the lack of Class AAAA schools in District VI, Mifflin County is part of the Mid-Penn Conference.

The school provides:
Varsity

Boys
Baseball - AAAA
Basketball - AAAA
Bowling - AAAA
Cross country - AAA
Football - AAAA
Golf - AAA
Indoor track and field - AAAA
Soccer - AAA
Swimming and diving - AAA
Tennis - AAA
Track and field - AAA
Wrestling - AAA

Girls
Basketball - AAAA
Bowling - AAAA
Cross country - AAA
Indoor track and field - AAAA
Field hockey - AAA
Soccer - AAA
Softball - AAAA
Swimming and diving - AAA
Tennis - AAA
Track and field - AAA
Volleyball - AAA

According to PIAA directory July 2014

See also
 Lewistown, Pennsylvania

References

Schools in Mifflin County, Pennsylvania
Public high schools in Pennsylvania
Educational institutions established in 2011
2011 establishments in Pennsylvania